The second of two 1947 Buenos Aires Grand Prix (official name: I Gran Premio de Eva Duarte Perón, also known as the II Gran Premio Ciudad de Buenos Aires) was a Grand Prix motor race held at the Retiro street circuit in Buenos Aires on February 15–16, 1947. Competitions opened on February 15 with two preliminary rounds of the Mecánica Argentina – Fuerza Limitada and Mecánica Argentina – Fuerza Libre classes for a combined final which determined the qualification for the February 16, Formula Libre main event.

Classification

References

Buenos Aires Grand Prix (II)
Buenos Aires Grand Prix (II)
Buenos Aires Grand Prix
Cultural depictions of Eva Perón